The checker-sided ctenotus (Ctenotus mimetes)  is a species of skink found in Western Australia.

References

mimetes
Reptiles described in 1969
Taxa named by Glen Milton Storr